Boysun is a city in Surxondaryo Region, Uzbekistan and capital of Boysun District. The population was 16,732 as of the 1989 census, and 27,600 in 2016. 

Thousands of years in the narrow mountain gorge, the merchant caravans have passed through Iron Gates. This region has been passed by the Armies of Alexander the Great, Genghis Khan, and Tamerlane. The Teshik-Tash caves contain remnants of the Neanderthal people. The nearby Kugitang Mountains nearby still contain wall paintings known as "magic bull hunting", dating from the Mesolite period.

Boysun's citizens adorn their homes with colorful suzane (sticky covers), lightweight, sturdy, and cozy tapestries, and elegant decorations and springwear embellish their clothes and shoes. On tables and sculptured trunks near walls are painted ceramic dinnerware.

Geography

Boysun lies in a valley running through a hilly region and overlooked by the Boysuntoq Ridge of the Gissar Range, which rises to  here and as even higher to the west. The landscape is dramatic but arid, and varies from grassy areas to exposed rock.

Climate

Boysun has a cool desert climate (Köppen climate classification BWk), with cool winters and hot summers. Rainfall is generally light and erratic. Autumn is the wettest season, while summers are very dry.

Transportation

The main road through the town is Route P-105. This connects with the M39 to the west near Shorab, leading to Dehqonobod, Gʻuzor, Shahrisabz and Samarkand further north, and to Akkurgon and Termez further south. To the east, P-105 connects to Shoʻrchi and Qumqoʻrgʻon.

World Heritage Status
This site was added to the UNESCO World Heritage Tentative List on 18 January 2008 in the Mixed (Cultural and Natural) category.

References

Masterpieces of the Oral and Intangible Heritage of Humanity
Populated places in Surxondaryo Region
Cities in Uzbekistan
World Heritage Tentative List